Priya Himesh (also credited as Priya Hemesh) is an Indian playback singer. She sings predominantly in Kannada, Telugu, Tamil, Malayalam and Odia movies. She has sung more than 200 songs working with many leading music directors like Illayaraja, Harris Jeyaraj, Imman, Vijay Antony, Devi Sri Prasad, Yuvan Shankar Raja, Mani Sharma, Karthik Raja, Bharadhwaj, Dhina, and numerous others.

Priya started singing in light music orchestras in 1989 and performed in more than 5000 stage shows with many leading orchestras in India and Overseas.

Priya is the recipient of Filmfare Awards South for her Telugu song "Ringa Ringa" in the film Aarya 2.

Selected discography

References 

Living people
Indian women playback singers
Singers from Chennai
Tamil playback singers
Telugu playback singers
Kannada playback singers
1982 births
21st-century Indian singers
21st-century Indian women singers
Women musicians from Tamil Nadu